The 1847 Grand National Steeplechase was the ninth official annual running of a Handicap Steeple-chase horse race which took place at Aintree Racecourse near Liverpool on 3 March 1847 and attracted a then record field of twenty-six runners. It was won by Mathew, ridden by Denny Wynne in the colours of County Cork landowner, John Courtenay. This was the first time the race was officially named The Grand National Steeplechase, having previously been run under the title, Grand Liverpool Steeplechase.

The Course
Contemporary newspaper reporters stated that the race was run over the same course as the previous year, describing the start as being a ploughed field with light fencing, narrow ditching and low cops and banks over four fields before bending to the left to jump a brook with short timber. The course then turned left towards the Canal over fences described as being of a practicable character before a leap over a sharp left turn before taking a decent water and timber jump. This took the runners over very heavy land to a ditch with a bank on the take off side. the next field led the runners into the lane at Anchor Bridge and then onto the course, the far end of which was known as the training ground with a stiff hurdle placed alongside the distance chair, topped with gorse six foot high. Opposite the stand was an artificial water jump fifteen feet wide and three feet deep. the runners then took a very awkward bank and ditch before crossing the lane at Melling Road before setting off on a second circuit. the finish of the race was beside the distance judge's chair meaning the fences to be taken was reduced from thirty-one the previous year to twenty-nine this year.

Start - Just beyond the Melling Road. Fence 1 [17 on the second circuit] Light fence. Fence 2 [18] Light fence. Fence 3 [19] A low cops. Fence 4 [20] Bank. Fence 5 [21] Brook with short timber. Fence 6 [22] Practicable fence. Fence 7 [23] Practicable fence. Fence 8 [24] A sharp left turn Fence 9 [25] A decent timber and water jump. Fence 10 [26] A fence into very heavy land. Fence 11 [27] A ditch with a bank. Fence 12 [28] A fence into the Anchor Bridge Road. Fence 13 [29] An artificial hurdle leaving the training ground on the racecourse proper. Fence 14 A stiff hurdle topped with gorse six feet high. Fence 15 A water jump increased in width by ten feet to fifteen feet and reduced in depth by a foot to three feet. Fence 16 An awkward bank and ditch.

Finishing order

Cure-All, Discount, Proceed, Profligate, Little Tommy, a horse by Tom Brown, Sam Slick, Railroad, Christopher North, Ragman, Forest Boy and Nimble Harry were withdrawn.

The Race

Grenade was the early leader but was jostled at the third fence and lost his place. Jerry and Ballybar then led the runners to the fourth fence where the latter refused and did not continue. The runners took the brook later to be known as Valentine's in great style but at the next obstacle several horses came into contact and Valeria was pulled up, being unable to continue.

Cumberland Lassie had been among the leaders throughout but as she approached the Anchor Bridge crossing she struck a post and ran off the course onto the road beyond.

Jerry led at the water jump, followed by Clinker, St Leger, St Ruth, Mathew, Culverthorpe, Pioneer and Brunette with these remaining the main contenders for most of the second circuit. Jerry was challenged by St Leger who appeared to the crowd to be on his way to victory until challenged and overhauled in the final strides by Mathew. Seven horses were recorded as finishing, though several other runners may have completed the course unrecorded by the press.

Aftermath
The win has gone down in history as being a hugely popular one among the Irish, bearing in mind that this was at the height of the Great Famine in the country. In truth the Irish press largely ignored the race in those days and it was only the wealthy friends of Mr John Courtenay in and around the County Cork area who benefited from the victory. In actuality Courtenay was considered among the most ruthless of the landowners who were, at this time forcibly evicting their tenants for being unable to meet their rent and as a result the rank and file Irishmen had placed heir support with another Irish entrant Brunette. In the event, it was only this huge body of support from across the Irish sea, and one large wager in particular that saw her start at all as she was not considered in a fit state to race at all. Later histories of the race state that she was tailed off for most of the race  but contemporary reports place her heavily involved in the front rank and her being recorded as a finisher support the contemporary accounts.

Much of the early history of the Grand National was told many years after the events and often from memory with the result that the winner, Mathew appears on the winners board at Aintree carrying the modern spelling of Matthew. The sixth horse The False Heir is often recorded as a non finisher while the favourite The Roarer, along with Young Lottery are not recorded as having taken part at all. As a result, many modern books and websites state six finishers in a field of twenty-six runners instead of the seven from twenty-eight recorded by the press of the time.

Sources
 The Irish Newsletter 4 March 1847
 The Times 4 March 1847
 The Liverpool Mercury 4 March 1847

Notes

 Grand National
 1847
Grand National
19th century in Lancashire
March 1847 sports events